The 2016 Lehigh Valley Steelhawks season was the sixth season for the American indoor football franchise, and their first in the American Indoor Football (AIF).

Schedule
Key:

Preseason
All start times are local to home team

Regular season
All start times are local to home team

Standings

Playoffs
All start times are local to home team

Roster

References

2016 American Indoor Football season
2016 in sports in Pennsylvania
Lehigh Valley Steelhawks